The Eurovision Young Musicians 1998 was the ninth edition of the Eurovision Young Musicians, held at Konzerthaus in Vienna on 4 June 1998. Organised by the European Broadcasting Union (EBU) and host broadcaster Österreichischer Rundfunk (ORF), musicians from eight countries participated in the televised final. A total of thirteen countries took part in the competition therefore a semi-final was held two days earlier. All participants performed a classical piece of their choice accompanied by the Vienna Radio Symphony Orchestra, conducted by Dennis Russell Davies.

 made their début, while  and  returned to the contest. Germany's withdrawal came as a particular surprise, as they had won the previous edition in 1996. The contest also saw the first withdrawal of the previous edition's host country, in this case 1996 hosts Portugal.

Lidia Baich of host country Austria won the contest, with Croatia and United Kingdom placing second and third respectively. Baich had represented Austria at the previous edition in 1996, placing second.

Location

The Konzerthaus, a concert hall in Vienna, Austria, was the host venue for the 1998 edition of the Eurovision Young Musicians. Opened in 1913, it is situated in the third district just at the edge of the first district in Vienna. Since it was founded it has always tried to emphasise both tradition and innovative musical styles.

The Konzerthaus has the Vienna Symphony, the Vienna Chamber Orchestra, the Wiener Singakademie and the Klangforum Wien in residence. Several subscriptions also include concerts by the Vienna Philharmonic and other organizations.

Format
Julian Rachlin was the host of the 1998 contest and performed during the interval.

Results

Preliminary round
A total of thirteen countries took part in the preliminary round of the 1998 contest, of which eight qualified to the televised grand final. The following countries failed to qualify.

  Cyprus

Final
Awards were given to the top three countries. The table below highlights these using gold, silver, and bronze. The placing results of the remaining participants is unknown and never made public by the European Broadcasting Union.

Jury members
The jury members consisted of the following:

  – Yehudi Menuhin (head)
  – Vadim Brodski
  – Gérard Caussé
 Friedrich Doligal
  – Jack Martin Händler
  – Nana Yashvili
 Eric Kushner
  – Alexei Lyubimov

Broadcasting
EBU members from the following countries broadcast the final round. The Final was also broadcast in Germany and Switzerland.

See also
 Eurovision Song Contest 1998

References

External links 
 

Eurovision Young Musicians by year
1998 in music
1998 in Austria
Music festivals in Austria
Events in Vienna
June 1998 events in Europe